Buckingham Borough Police was the police force responsible for policing the Borough of Buckingham, situated in the county of Buckinghamshire, England until 1892.

It was formed as a result of the Municipal Corporations Act 1835.  The force was amalgamated into the Buckinghamshire Constabulary following the Local Government Act 1888.

Today, the area is policed by the successor to Buckinghamshire Constabulary, Thames Valley Police

References

Defunct police forces of England
History of Buckinghamshire